Beasain  is a town and municipality located in the Goierri region of the province of Gipuzkoa, in the Autonomous Community of the Basque Country, northern Spain. It has an important industry of railway vehicles and related equipment (CAF)  that exports its production around the world.

In 2015 it had a population of 13,980 inhabitants.

Notable people 
 Karlos Arguiñano (born September 6, 1948) is a Spanish chef.
 Pako Ayestarán (born 5 February 1963) is a Spanish football manager, currently Head Coach of Valencia CF.
 Gorka Elustondo (born 18 March 1987) is a Spanish football player, currently playing for Rayo Vallecano

References

External links

 Official website 
 "Beasain", Auñamendi Eusko Entziklopedia 

Municipalities in Gipuzkoa